La Guerche-de-Bretagne is a commune in the Ille-et-Vilaine department in Brittany in northwestern France.

The cellist Louis-Marie Pilet (1815–1877) was born in La Guerche-de-Bretagne.

Population
Inhabitants of La Guerche-de-Bretagne are called Guerchais in French.

See also
Communes of the Ille-et-Vilaine department

References

External links

Official website 

Mayors of Ille-et-Vilaine Association 

Communes of Ille-et-Vilaine